The 1925 Campeonato Gaúcho was the fifth season of Rio Grande do Sul's top association football league. Bagé won their first title. This season is the first since 1922, as play was suspended due to the Federalist Revolution.

Format 

The championship changed its format for the 1925 season. Nine region championships were contested, whose champions would play zonal finals, determining the five teams qualified to the state championship which was contested in a single-elimination basis.

Qualified teams 

The following teams were eliminated in the regional rounds: 14 de Julho, 15 de Novembro (Dom Pedrito), Bataclan, Carlos Barbosa, General Osório, Grêmio Santanense, Guarani de Alegrete, Guarany de Cachoeira do Sul, Novo Hamburgo, Pelotas and Taquarense.

Championship

First round

Semifinals

Final

References 

Campeonato Gaúcho seasons
1925 in Brazilian football leagues